Julian Gardner may refer to:

 Julian Gardner (poker player) (born 1978), British professional poker player
 Julian Gardner (lawyer), Australian lawyer noted for his advancement of human rights
 Julian Gardner (rugby player) (born 1964), Australian rugby union player
 Julian Gardner (art historian) (born 1940), British art historian